Hoplisoides costalis is a species of sand wasp in the family Crabronidae. It is found in Central America and North America.

References

Crabronidae
Hymenoptera of North America
Insects described in 1873
Taxa named by Ezra Townsend Cresson
Articles created by Qbugbot